The 2011 Hell in a Cell was the third annual Hell in a Cell professional wrestling pay-per-view (PPV) event produced by WWE. It took place on October 2, 2011, at the New Orleans Arena in New Orleans, Louisiana. Seven matches took place at the event. The event received 182,000 pay-per-view buys, down from 210,000 buys the previous year.

Eight matches took place at the event, including one match on the pre-show. In the main event, Alberto Del Rio defeated CM Punk and defending champion John Cena in the first-ever Triple Threat Hell in a Cell match to win the WWE Championship. The event also featured a second Hell in a Cell match in which Mark Henry defeated Randy Orton in a Hell in a Cell match to retain the World Heavyweight Championship.

Production

Background 
Hell in a Cell is a gimmick pay-per-view (PPV) event produced annually in October by WWE since 2009—in April 2011, the promotion ceased going by its full name of World Wrestling Entertainment, with "WWE" becoming an orphaned initialism. The concept of the show comes from WWE's established Hell in a Cell match, in which competitors fight inside a 20-foot-high roofed cell structure surrounding the ring and ringside area. The main event match of the card is contested under the Hell in a Cell stipulation. The 2011 event was the third event under the Hell in a Cell chronology and was held on October 2 at the New Orleans Arena in New Orleans, Louisiana. It was the first Hell in a Cell event held since the end of the first brand split in August.

Storylines 
Hell in a Cell featured professional wrestling matches which involve different wrestlers from pre-existing scripted feuds, plots, and storylines that played out on WWE's television programs. Wrestlers portrayed villains or heroes as they followed a series of events that built tension and culminated in a wrestling match or series of matches.

The main rivalry heading into Hell in a Cell involved the WWE Championship. On September 18, 2011, John Cena defeated Alberto Del Rio at Night of Champions to become the ten-time WWE Champion. On the following night's episode of Raw, WWE COO Triple H announced the first-ever Triple Threat Hell in a Cell match, in which Cena would defend his title against Alberto Del Rio and CM Punk, giving Punk the rematch clause he never received.

Another rivalry involved the World Heavyweight Championship. On September 18, 2011, Mark Henry defeated Randy Orton at Night of Champions to win his first ever World Title. On the following night's episode of Raw, SmackDown General Manager Theodore Long announced that Orton would invoke his rematch clause at Hell in a Cell, and that the rematch would take place inside that structure.

Event

Preliminary matches 
The actual pay-per-view opened with Christian facing Sheamus. In the end, Christian attempted a Spear on Sheamus, but Sheamus avoided it and Christian collided with the ring post. Sheamus performed a Brogue Kick on Christian to win the match.

Next, Sin Cara Azul faced Sin Cara Negro. Sin Cara Azul performed a Sunset Flip Powerbomb on Sin Cara Negro to win the match.

After that, Air Boom (Evan Bourne and Kofi Kingston) defended the WWE Tag Team Championship against Jack Swagger and United States Champion Dolph Ziggler. The match ended when Swagger attempted a Superbomb on Bourne, who countered into a Super Hurricanrana and pinned Swagger with a roll up to retain the title.

In the fourth match, Mark Henry defended the World Heavyweight Championship against Randy Orton in a Hell in a Cell match. In the end, Orton performed an RKO on Henry for a near-fall. Orton attempted a Punt Kick on Henry, who countered the move into a World's Strongest Slam on Orton to retain the title. After the match, Henry performed a second World's Strongest Slam on Orton and retrieved a chair, placing Orton's leg in the chair. Henry attempted a Corner Slingshot Splash onto the chair, but Orton avoided the attempt and hit Henry with the chair, leading to Henry retreating.

WWE Intercontinental Champion Cody Rhodes cut a promo, introducing a new design for the Intercontinental Championship belt. John Laurinaitis interrupted Rhodes, announcing he would defend the WWE Intercontinental Championship against John Morrison. The impromptu match ended when Morrison attempted a Springboard Roundhouse Kick on Rhodes, who avoided the move and pinned Morrison with an Oklahoma Roll to retain the title.

In the sixth match, Kelly Kelly defended the Divas Championship against Beth Phoenix. Phoenix would target Kelly's lower back throughout the match by applying various submission holds and stretches. In the end of the match, Natalya hit Kelly with the microphone without the referee seeing it, giving Phoenix the opportunity to perform the Glam Slam on Kelly to win the title.

Main event 
In the main event, John Cena defended the WWE Championship against Alberto Del Rio and CM Punk in a Triple Threat Hell in a Cell match. During the match, Del Rio performed a Belly to Back Suplex on Cena through a chair. Cena performed an Attitude Adjustment on Punk but Del Rio voided the pinfall. Del Rio applied the Cross Armbreaker on Cena but Punk broke up the hold. Punk performed a GTS on Cena but Del Rio pulled Punk out of the ring, voiding the pinfall. Del Rio pushed Punk, causing Punk to fall off the top rope through a table. Cena applied the STF on Del Rio but Ricardo Rodriguez opened the cell door and threw a lead pipe into the ring. Cena performed an Attitude Adjustment on Rodriguez outside the cell but Del Rio hit Cena with the lead pipe and locked the cell door. Punk attempted a GTS on Del Rio but Del Rio hit Punk with the lead pipe and pinned Punk to win the title.

After the match, Cena attacked Del Rio whilst the cell was being lowered. The Miz and R Truth emerged from under the ring, attacking Punk, Cena, Del Rio, two referee and two cameramens. All the wrestlers, security officers, and COO Triple H attempted to enter the cell but the cell was locked. After the New Orleans Police Department appeared and attempted to enter the cell, a man with bolt cutters broke the lock. After Miz and R-Truth were arrested, Triple H attacked them.

Aftermath
After Hell In A Cell, the feud between Christian and Sheamus continued over the next couple of weeks, they fought each other and a match was made between the two again at Vengeance, which Sheamus won.

The feud between the two Sin Caras ended on the following episode of SmackDown in a Mask vs. Mask Match, which Sin Cara Negro lost.

The feud over the WWE Tag Team championships ended at Vengeance, which Bourne and Kingston won.

The feud between Mark Henry and Randy Orton ended and Mark Henry continued his feud with The Big Show. At Capitol Punishment, during Show's match with Alberto Del Rio, Henry attacked Show before the match and put him through the announce table. A match between Big Show and Mark Henry was made at Money In The Bank. At Money In The Bank, Mark Henry won the match. After the match Henry attacked Show and injured Big Show's ankle, which put Big Show out of action for 3 months. On the Smackdown following Hell in the Cell, Show returned and attacked Henry. A match was set up between the two at Vengeance and it was for the World Heavyweight championship. At Vengeance during the match, Mark Henry superplexed Big Show and the ring collapsed, so it ended in a no contest. A match was set up at Survivor Series, Big Show won by disqualification. Smackdown general manager, Teddy Long then made a match between Show and Henry at TLC and announced that it would be a Chairs Match. At TLC, Big Show won the World Heavyweight championship, but after the match Show was attacked by Henry which allowed Daniel Bryan to cash in his Money in the Bank contract and win the World Heavyweight championship. At Royal Rumble 2012, both Big Show and Mark Henry challenged Daniel Bryan for the World Heavyweight championship, which Bryan retained.

After Hell in a Cell, Cody Rhodes started a feud with former Legacy member, Randy Orton, which led to the match between the two at Vengeance, which Orton won after a RKO.

Kelly Kelly and Eve Torres faced Beth Phoenix and Natalya in a Tag Team match, Beth and Natalya won by disqualification after Eve and Kelly attacked them by throwing Natalya into the barricade and Beth being thrown into and hit on the announce table causing a disqualification.

At the conclusion of Hell In A Cell, The Miz and R Truth came from under the ring and attacked Punk, Cena, and Del Rio to get revenge for being fired. All the wrestlers (faces and heels), security officers, and COO Triple H went to the Cell to get in, but it was locked. R Truth knocked out both of the cameramen who were in the cell. A few minutes into the attack, the New Orleans Police Department showed up trying all they can to get in. A man with bolt cutters showed up, and they finally broke the lock. After Miz and Truth were arrested, WWE COO Triple H attacked Truth and Miz. The incident caused every wrestler, broadcaster, ring announcer, referee, and cameraman to all walk out on Triple H. The next week on Raw, Triple H cut a promo about the walkout. The only wrestlers that did not walk out were Sheamus, CM Punk, and John Cena. They all expressed the opinions. A match was set up between Sheamus and Cena with Triple H as referee, and CM Punk as the commentator, and the bell ringer. During the match, WWE Chairman Mr. McMahon interrupted it to tell Triple H that the WWE Board of Directors said that Triple H couldn't control Raw and named John Laurinaitis the new General Manager. All the people that walked out, came back in the arena and congratulated the general manager. Laurinaitis then rehired The Miz and R Truth and they attacked Triple H and CM Punk. A match was made at Vengeance, which put Triple H and CM Punk against The Miz and R Truth, which Truth and Miz won thanks to the interference from Kevin Nash. Nash attacked Triple H with his sledgehammer. Triple H returned and attacked Nash, which led to their match at TLC in a Ladder Match. At TLC, Triple H defeated Kevin Nash.

Results

References

External links
Official Hell in a Cell site

2011
Events in New Orleans
2011 in Louisiana
Professional wrestling in New Orleans
2011 WWE pay-per-view events
October 2011 events in the United States